Tin Shui is an MTR Light Rail stop. It is located at ground level at Tin Shui Road, near Tin Shui Estate, in Tin Shui Wai, Yuen Long District. It began service on 10 January 1993 and belongs to Zone 4.

History
The stop was the terminus of Light Rail Tin Shui Wai Branch (First Phase) from 1993 to 1995. But it became an intermediate station after the line was extended to Tin Shui Wai Terminus (now Tin Wing) in 1995.

References

MTR Light Rail stops
Former Kowloon–Canton Railway stations
Tin Shui Wai
Railway stations in Hong Kong opened in 1993
MTR Light Rail stops named from housing estates